Cause of Divorce (Italian: Causa di divorzio) is a 1972 comedy film directed by Marcello Fondato and starring Enrico Montesano, Senta Berger and Catherine Spaak. It was made as a co-production between Italy and West Germany.

Cast
 Enrico Montesano as Silvestro Parolini  
 Senta Berger as Enrica Sebastiani  
 Catherine Spaak as Ernesta Maini  
 Gastone Moschin as Lawyer  
 Lino Toffolo as Vladimiro Pellegrini  
 Gabriella Giorgelli as Gasoline pump attendant  
 Arnoldo Foà as Maini - father of Ernesta  
 Francesco Mulé as Judge 
 Lino Banfi as Foreman  
 Bruno Boschetti as Doctor

References

Bibliography 
 Moliterno, Gino. The A to Z of Italian Cinema. Scarecrow Press, 2009.

External links 
 

1972 films
1972 comedy films
German comedy films
West German films
1970s Italian-language films
Films directed by Marcello Fondato
Italian comedy films
1970s Italian films
1970s German films